The Alamosa County Courthouse, at 702 Fourth St. in Alamosa, Colorado, was listed on the National Register of Historic Places in 1995.

It is a U-shaped two-story complex, made up of three separate buildings joined by covered walkways, plus a fourth separate jail building.  It was built during 1937 to 1938.  It was a Works Progress Administration project.  It was deemed a good example of Mission Revival architecture.

References

County courthouses in Colorado
National Register of Historic Places in Alamosa County, Colorado
Mission Revival architecture in Colorado